The Hyundai Mistra is a mid-size sedan manufactured by Hyundai through the Beijing Hyundai joint venture in China. It slots between the Hyundai Elantra and Hyundai Sonata in Hyundai's Chinese vehicle line-up. The first generation was produced between 2013 and 2020 with a facelift launched in 2017, while the second generation was unveiled in 2020, with an electric version also available with a range of 520 km.



First generation (CF; 2013)

The Mistra was first teased as a concept vehicle at the 2013 Shanghai Auto Show and was launched as a production model in the end of 2013, as a model of 2014. It was developed with the Chinese market in mind but may be produced for other markets in the near future.

The Mistra was conceived as a premium compact vehicle, a popular and growing niche within the Chinese automobile market which typically includes, a longer wheelbase, extended rear legroom, higher quality interior trim, and luxury features usually not available on compact vehicles. Included amongst the features of the Mistra are real wood trim and metal trim, an LCD instrument display and leather interior.

Engines
The Mistra is available with two variants of the Hyundai Nu engine. A 1.8-litre variant producing 143 horsepower, and a 2.0-litre version producing 155 horsepower.

2017 facelift

The first generation Hyundai Mistra received a facelift that debuted in April 2017 on the Shanghai Auto Show, and was available to the market in May 2017. The updated exterior styling features a redesigned front end with updated headlamps, front bumper, and grilles and a restyled rear bumper in the rear. The updated interior features an 8-inch touch screen equipped with Apple CarPlay and Baidu CarLife for the infotainment system.

Second generation (DU2; 2020)

The second generation Mistra was first unveiled at the 2020 Guangzhou Auto Show and was planned to be available on the market in 2021. It was developed exclusively for the Chinese market.

Engines
The second generation Mistra is available with two engines. A 1.8-litre variant producing 143 horsepower mated to a 7-speed DCT, and a 1.5-litre turbo version producing 170 horsepower mated to a CVT.

Gallery

References

External links

 

Mistra
Compact cars
Sedans
Front-wheel-drive vehicles
Cars of China
Cars introduced in 2013